Brian James Jones (born 10 October 1935) is a former  international rugby union player.

Jones made his debut for Wales on 12 March 1960 versus Ireland. He played club rugby for Newport RFC.

References 

1935 births
Living people
Alumni of the University of Exeter
Barbarian F.C. players
Combined Services rugby union players
Cross Keys RFC players
Newport RFC players
Rugby union centres
Rugby union players from Caerphilly County Borough
Tredegar RFC players
Wales international rugby union players
Welsh rugby union players